Dom Dom is a Japanese fast food restaurant chain operated by Dom Dom Food Service, Inc. It used to be operated by Orange Food Court, Inc before July 2017. Dom Dom was the first hamburger chain to open in Japan, with the first restaurant opening in February 1970.

References

External links

 

Fast-food franchises
Fast-food chains of Japan
Fast-food hamburger restaurants
Restaurants established in 1970
1970 establishments in Japan